Atefeh Rajabi Sahaaleh (September 21, 1987 – August 15, 2004) was an Iranian girl from the town of Neka who was executed a week after being sentenced to death by Haji Rezai, head of Neka's court, on charges of adultery and crimes against chastity.

Numerous Iranian journalists and lawyers had "strong evidence that the judiciary had broken Iran's own law in executing Atefah", but this was difficult to show because of Iran's press censorship.

Early life

Born in Mashhad, Atefeh's mother died in a car accident when she was five. Shortly after, her younger brother is said to have drowned in a river. Her father became a drug addict, and she was forced to care for her octogenarian grandparents. Despite her attention to their needs they are reported to have completely ignored her. She was described as a "lively and intelligent girl."

Arrest 
Atefeh was convicted for crimes against chastity after being raped repeatedly by Ali Darabi, an 51-year-old ex-revolutionary guard turned taxi driver. Darabi was a married man with children at the time.

Atefeh had been raped by Darabi over a period of 3 years without her family being aware. While in prison she was further allegedly tortured and raped by prison guards. She told this to her grandmother who visited her saying that afterwards she could only walk on all fours because of the pain. The judge in her case was Haji Rezai. When Atefah realized that she was losing her case, she removed her hijab, an act seen as a severe contempt of the court, and argued that Ali Darabi should be punished, not her. She even removed her shoes and threw them at the judge. Rezai later sentenced her to death.

According to the BBC, the documents presented to the Supreme Court of Appeal described her as 22 years old, but her birth certificate and death certificate stated that she was 16. The issue of her age was not brought to proper attention before it was too late.

Amnesty International and other organisations claimed that she had a psychological illness, both before and at the trial.

Execution 
She was publicly hanged from a crane in Neka on August 15, 2004. Amnesty International and other organizations declared her execution to be a crime against humanity and against children of the world.

Aftermath 
After the execution of Atefeh, Iranian media reported that Judge Rezai and several militia members, including Captain Zabihi and Captain Molai, were arrested by the Intelligence Ministry. The execution is considered controversial because as a signatory of the International Covenant on Civil and Political Rights, Iran promised not to execute anyone under the age of 18. Atefeh's father had passed her birth certificate to the civil authorities, lawyers involved, journalists and Judge Rezai. Pursuant to continual complaints filed by Atefeh's family, and heavy international pressure about her execution and the way the judge mishandled the case, the Supreme Court of Iran issued an order to posthumously pardon Atefeh.

Documentaries 
The case of Atefeh Sahaaleh is the subject of a BBC documentary made by Wild Pictures in 2006. Monica Garnsey and Arash Sahami went undercover to document the case. It is also the subject of an hour-long Discovery Times program called Execution in Iran.

See also
 Human rights in Iran
 Delara Darabi
 Nazanin Fatehi
 Reza Alinejad
 Mosleh Zamani
 Stop Child Executions Campaign
 List of miscarriage of justice cases
 Women's rights in Iran

References

External links
 Execution of a teenage girl BBC
 Amnesty International statement
 Media | Death of a teenager (Guardian UK July 27, 2006)

Women's rights in Iran
Sharia in Asia
Executed Iranian people
1987 births
2004 deaths
Executed Iranian women
21st-century executions by Iran
Executed children
People from Mazandaran Province
People executed for adultery
People executed by Iran by hanging
Wrongful executions
People who have received posthumous pardons
Violence against women in Iran